The 2016–17 Saint Joseph's Hawks basketball team represented Saint Joseph's University during the 2016–17 NCAA Division I men's basketball season. The Hawks, led by 22nd-year head coach Phil Martelli, played their home games at Hagan Arena in Philadelphia, Pennsylvania as members of the Atlantic 10 Conference. They finished the season 11–20, 4–14 A-10 play to finish in a tie for 12th place. As the No. 13 seed in the A-10 tournament, they lost to Massachusetts in the first round.

Previous season
The Hawks finished the 2015–16 season with a record of 28–8, 13–5 in A-10 play to finish in fourth place. They defeated George Washington, Dayton, and VCU to be with the A-10 tournament and earn the conference's automatic bid to the NCAA tournament. As a #8 seed, they defeated Cincinnati in the first round, their first NCAA Tournament victory since 2004, to advance to the second round where they lost to Oregon. DeAndre' Bembry was named A-10 player of the year.

Preseason 
Saint Joseph's was picked to finish in ninth place in the Preseason A-10 poll.

Offseason

Departures

2016 recruiting class

2017 recruiting class

Roster

Schedule and results

|-
!colspan=9 style=| Regular season

|-
!colspan=9 style=| Atlantic 10 tournament

References

Saint Joseph's Hawks men's basketball seasons
Saint Joseph's
Saint Joseph's
Saint Joseph's